Çuka e Partizanit is a mountain peak in Albania.

References

Mountains of Albania